Rick van der Ven (born 14 April 1991, in Oss) is a Dutch archer who started to practise archery at the age of 8.

In 2009 at the World Junior Championship in Ogden, Utah Rick was the runner-up with a silver medal. In 2011 at the World Junior Championship in Legnica, Poland he won silver with the Mixed Team, bronze with the men's team and finished 4th in the individual event.  In May 2012 in the Olympic Stadium in Amsterdam, Van der Ven became European Champion in Outdoor Archery, both individually and in the team event.  In February 2013, in Rzeszów, Van der Ven became also European Champion Indoor, again individually as well as with the Dutch team.

2012 Olympic Games
Van der Ven competed at the 2012 Summer Olympics in London in men's individual archery. He was coached by Wietse van Alten, winner of the bronze medal in Sydney 2000. In an upset victory, he convincingly beat top-seed and world-record holder Im Dong-hyun 7–1 in the round of 16. After beating Kuo Cheng-Wei 6–0 in the quarterfinals, he came to a 5–5 draw in the semi-finals against Takaharu Furukawa, shooting 141 versus Furukawa's 140. In the following shoot-off he shot a 9 while Furukawa shot a 10, relegating him to a bronze medal match against Dai Xiaoxiang. Here Van der Ven again came to a 5–5 draw, scoring 2 points more than his opponent, but lost again in the first shoot-off, thereby finishing in 4th position.
Since 2009 Rick van der Ven is training at The Olympic Sportcentre in Papendal and is studying Engineering Mechanics in Arnhem.

2016 Olympic Games 
At the 2016 Olympic Games, van der Ven competed in both the individual and the men's team events. In the individual event, van der Ven was in 27th after the ranking round, and faced Patrick Huston in the first knock-out round, losing 4–6. In the team event, the Netherlands were ranked in 9th after the ranking round.  They faced the Spanish team in the first elimination round, winning 5–1, before losing to the South Korean team 0–6.

Results 2007

Results 2008

Results 2009

Results 2010

Results 2011

Results 2012

Results 2013

Results 2014

Results 2015

Results 2016

Results 2017

Results 2018

Results 2019

Results 2022

Van der Ven and Gabriela Schloesser won the gold medal in the mixed team recurve event at the 2022 European Archery Championships held in Munich, Germany.

References

External links
 
 

1991 births
Living people
Dutch male archers
Archers at the 2012 Summer Olympics
Archers at the 2016 Summer Olympics
Archers at the 2015 European Games
European Games medalists in archery
European Games bronze medalists for the Netherlands
Olympic archers of the Netherlands
Sportspeople from Oss
World Archery Championships medalists
21st-century Dutch people